The Atlantic, Suwannee River and Gulf Railroad Company was a railroad that ran westward from Starke, Florida, eventually terminating at Wannee, Florida, on the Suwannee River. It was later absorbed by the Seaboard Air Line Railroad becoming their Wannee Subdivision.

Construction
The Starke to Wannee rail line was initiated in 1891 with the incorporation of the Starke and Sampson City Railway Company. The company failed after grading the right-of-way from Starke to Sampson City, and in 1892 transferred the right-of-way to the Ambler Lumber Co.

The Atlantic, Suwannee River and Gulf Railroad (ASR&G) was incorporated under the general incorporation laws of Florida in 1893. Shortly after incorporation, the company purchased the graded right-of-way between Starke and Sampson City from the Ambler Lumber Company and contracted with the Atlantic Lumber Company (successor to the Ambler Lumber Company) to lay the track. The track from Starke reached Sampson City in August, 1863, and LaCrosse in March, 1894. After a pause, The track reached Alachua in July, 1896, and Buda, between High Springs and Newberry, in July, 1897. The completed line was standard gauge and single-track. The ASR&GR under FC&PR control operated the line from Starke to Buda, and the Atlantic Lumber Company operated the line from Buda to Wannee. Operation of both the FC&PR and the ASR&GR was taken over by the Seaboard Air Line Railroad in July, 1900, and both were formally adsorbed by the SAL in June, 1903. From its founding until its absorption by the SAL, the ASR&GR had served primarily to feed timber and lumber to the FC&PR.

Later history
The Seaboard Air Line removed the track between Wannee and Bell in the 1930s. Much of the line west of Brooker was abandoned after the Seaboard Air Line merged with its competitor, the Atlantic Coast Line Railroad, in 1967. The track from Buda to Bell would remain as a spur of the West Coast Subdivision (an ex-ACL line) until the 1980s.

The Seaboard Coast Line became CSX Transportation in the 1980s.  In the 1990s, CSX rebuilt a short segment of the Atlantic, Suwannee River and Gulf Railway to Hainesworth to reconnect with the remains of the former Jacksonville and Southwestern Railroad, which had just been severed from its system.  This segment is now CSX Transportation's Brooker Subdivision and is still in service.  The line's connection with the CSX S Line is still known as Wannee Junction.

Historic stations

Notes

References

Sources

Defunct Florida railroads
Predecessors of the Seaboard Air Line Railroad
Railway companies established in 1893
Railway companies disestablished in 1909
1893 establishments in Florida
American companies established in 1893